Sugimanuru Airport  is a domestic airport located at Raha, the capital of Muna Regency, Southeast Sulawesi province on the island of Sulawesi in Indonesia.

Expansion
in 2014, the regent of Muna district built a new terminal at a cost of more than 3 billion Rupiah. And it was completed in September, 2022.

Airlines and destinations

References

Airports in Southeast Sulawesi